Frederick Norman Grimshaw (1910–1979) was an English cricketer active from 1927 to 1938 who played for Northamptonshire (Northants). He was born in Leeds on 5 May 1910. He appeared in 78 first-class matches as a righthanded batsman who bowled right arm slow. He scored 2,445 runs with a highest score of 92 and took six wickets with a best performance of two for 60. He also played for Yorkshire second XI in the Minor Counties championship from 1927 to 1932.

He died in Leeds in 1979.

Notes

1910 births
English cricketers
Northamptonshire cricketers
1979 deaths